Bordesley and Highgate is an electoral ward of Birmingham City Council in the centre of Birmingham, West Midlands, England, covering an urban area immediately to the east of the city centre, including the historic district of Digbeth. The ward was created on 1st December 2017 as a result of boundary changes that saw the number of wards in Birmingham increase from 40 to 69.

Boundaries 
Bordesley and Highgate ward includes the Highgate, Bordesley, Digbeth and Deritend areas and as such includes some of the oldest parts of the city.  The ward is in the Birmingham Ladywood UK Parliament constituency.

Councillors

Elections since 2018

Notes

References 

Wards of Birmingham, West Midlands